Pseudotanais jonesi is a species of tanaidacean crustacean.

Description
There are neither eyes nor ocular lobes on the head. Males are very similar to P. forcipatus, which is the only other species in the family to occur around the British Isles. In females, the cephalothorax is about 1.5 times as wide as it is long, and is triangular. Both the endopodite and the exopodite of the females' uropods are two-segmented, while males have a three-segmented endopodite.

Distribution
Pseudotanais jonesi has only been discovered at a few sites around the British Isles.

References

Tanaidacea
Crustaceans of the Atlantic Ocean
Crustaceans described in 1977